Francis Hardy (14 December 1923 – 11 March 2021) was a French politician.

Biography
Prior to his political career, Hardy played rugby for US Cognac and subsequently became president of the club. He lived in Cognac and was President of Hardy Cognac SA, his family's business. As Mayor of Cognac, he installed a library and an art museum. He served in the National Assembly from 1973 to 1981 and again from 1986 to 1988. He served on the Poitou-Charentes Regional Council, where he served as president from 1978 to 1980. In the 2014 French municipal elections, he supported Noël Belliot for Mayor of Cognac.

Francis Hardy died on 11 March 2021 at the age of 97.

Bibliography
Cognac, ma vie, ma ville (2010)

References

1923 births
2021 deaths
Deputies of the 5th National Assembly of the French Fifth Republic
Deputies of the 6th National Assembly of the French Fifth Republic
Deputies of the 8th National Assembly of the French Fifth Republic
French rugby union players
Mayors of places in Nouvelle-Aquitaine
Rally for the Republic politicians
Union for French Democracy politicians
French sportsperson-politicians